Emilio Dell'Oro (born January 2, 1900, date of death unknown) was an Italian bobsledder who competed in the 1930s.

He finished tenth in the four-man event at the 1936 Winter Olympics in Garmisch-Partenkirchen, Germany.

References
 1936 bobsleigh four-man results
 1936 Olympic Winter Games official report.  - p. 415.

1900 births
Year of death missing
Italian male bobsledders
Olympic bobsledders of Italy
Bobsledders at the 1936 Winter Olympics